The Mocha coffee bean is a variety of coffee bean originally from Yemen. It is harvested from the coffee-plant species Coffea arabica, which is native to Yemen. In appearance it is very small, hard, round with an irregular shape, and olive green to pale yellow in color.

The name "Mocha" comes from the port of Mocha (al-Mukhā) through which most Yemeni coffee was exported before the 20th century. , it was mostly exported via Aden and Hodeida. The central market for Yemeni coffee is at Bayt al-Faqih, about 140 km north of Mocha, and the coffee is grown in the mountain districts of Jabal Haraz, al-Udayn (sometimes written Uden), and Ta'izz, to the east.

See also 
Caffè mocha

References 

Coffea